Chandrani Bandara Jayasinghe is a Sri Lankan politician and a former member of the Parliament of Sri Lanka.

References
 

Living people
Members of the 11th Parliament of Sri Lanka
Members of the 12th Parliament of Sri Lanka
Members of the 13th Parliament of Sri Lanka
Members of the 14th Parliament of Sri Lanka
Members of the 15th Parliament of Sri Lanka
United National Party politicians
1962 births
Women's ministers of Sri Lanka
21st-century Sri Lankan women politicians
Women government ministers of Sri Lanka
Women legislators in Sri Lanka